Fang Hao (born 3 January 2000) is a Chinese professional footballer currently playing as a forward for Chinese Super League club Shandong Taishan.

Club career
Coming through Shandong Taishan's youth academy, Fang joined China League One club Inner Mongolia Zhongyou for the 2020 season and then Chinese Super League club Wuhan F.C. for the 2021 season on loan respectively. He made his debut for Taishan on 3 June 2022 in a 1-0 win over Zhejiang, coming on as an 81st-minute substitute but had to come off less than 10 minutes later as captain Zheng Zheng was sent off and the team needed to bring on another defender.

International career
On 26 March 2022, Fang drew widespread attention after scoring 4 goals in a 4-2 victory over Thailand U23 in the 2022 Dubai Cup. On 20 July 2022, Fang made his international debut in a 3-0 defeat against South Korea in the 2022 EAFF E-1 Football Championship, as the Chinese FA decided to field the U-23 national team for this senior competition.

Career statistics

Club
.

 Notes

References

External links

2000 births
 Living people
Chinese footballers
 Chinese expatriate footballers
 Association football forwards
 Shandong Taishan F.C. players
 Inner Mongolia Zhongyou F.C. players
 Wuhan F.C. players
 China League One players
 Chinese Super League players
 Chinese expatriate sportspeople in Brazil
 Expatriate footballers in Brazil
21st-century Chinese people